Atractus trefauti is a species of snake in the family Colubridae. The species can be found in French Guiana and Brazil.

References 

Atractus
Reptiles of French Guiana
Reptiles of Brazil
Snakes of South America
Reptiles described in 2019